The City Hall in Singapore is a national monument gazetted on 14 February 1992. It can be found in front of the historical Padang and adjacent to the Supreme Court of Singapore, it was designed and built by the architects of the Singapore Municipal Commission, A. Gordans and F. D. Meadows from 1926 to 1929. A flight of stairs takes visitors from the Corinthian colonnade to the main building. The building was constructed to replace several houses designed by architect G.D. Coleman. It was first known as Municipal Building until 1951 when Singapore was granted city status by King George VI.

History

The Municipal Building was planned and designed by the municipal architect S. D. Meadows, and then by Alexander Gordon, who took over the position in 1925. The London construction firm Perry and Co. (Overseas) Ltd. began in 1926 and was completed in 1929. By April the municipality moved into its new home. The Governor Hugh Clifford then officially opened the new Municipal Building on 23 July 1929. During World War II, when the Japanese occupied Singapore, they managed civic issues from the Municipal Building. Political affairs were already being conducted in the building. In 1943, the leader of the Indian National Army, Subhas Chandra Bose, rallied for Japanese support to help India be independent of British rule at the Municipal Building. British prisoners-of-war were rounded up in front of the building to march to POW camps such as Changi Prison and Selarang. On 12 September 1945, the Japanese Japanese Itagaki surrendered to Lord Mountbatten on the steps of the building to end World War II in Singapore. In 1951, it was renamed to its present name City Hall to mark Singapore as a city, after being granted city status.

In 1959, then Prime Minister Lee Kuan Yew declared self-governance at City Hall. It was also the first time that the people of Singapore heard the new national anthem and saw their national flag. Lee and his eight cabinet ministers were then sworn into political office in the chamber of City Hall before the first Yang di-Pertuan Negara, Yusof bin Ishak, whose oath was taken at the City Hall as well. Lee Kuan Yew read out the Malaysia Proclamation at the City Hall in 1963, and declared that Singapore was no longer under British rule. The people celebrated the first Malaysia Day at the Padang which was outside the City Hall. When Singapore was no longer a part of Malaysia, The first National Day Parade was held there in 1966. The steps of the City Hall are also used as a VIP seating area when National Day Parades were held there.

Singapore has a unitary system of government. It has not had a mayor or a city council since the end of British rule. The ruling People's Action Party abolished the City Council and the Rural Board in 1959, and the mayor's role disappeared. However, there are five Community Development Councils (namely Central Singapore, Northeast, Northwest, Southeast and Southwest) which was established in 1997. The CDCs are not directly elected bodies, rather each of them consists of 12 to 80 members appointed by the People's Association Chairman or Deputy Chairman. Each of the five CDCs is headed by a mayor, which is usually an elected MP in the Parliament of Singapore.

In 1987, the building underwent a massive upgrade to allow the building to house governmental offices. In 1988, twelve courtrooms of the City Hall were transferred to the Supreme Court. This restoration work earned a Good Effort Award in 1994 by the Urban Redevelopment Authority. The City Hall was the place where Prime Minister Goh Chok Tong had his inauguration ceremony and the swearing-in of his cabinet in 1990. The building was also used for many government events over the years, it was used as a venue for the Singapore Biennale, and for the IMF and World Bank Meetings when it was held in Singapore in 2006.

In 2015, The City Hall, together with the adjacent Old Supreme Court Building, has been converted into the National Gallery Singapore.

See also
 City Hall MRT station
 Supreme Court of Singapore

References
 National Heritage Board (2002), Singapore's 100 Historic Places, Archipelago Press,

External links

 City Hall
 Singapore civic politics
 CDCs 

Downtown Core (Singapore)
Singapore
Places in Singapore
National monuments of Singapore
Tourist attractions in Singapore
Landmarks in Singapore
Government buildings in Singapore
Government buildings completed in 1929
20th-century architecture in Singapore